Universal default is the term for a practice in the financial services industry in the United States for a particular lender to change the terms of a loan from the normal terms to the default terms (i.e. the terms and rates given to those who have missed payments on a loan) when that lender is informed that their customer has defaulted with another lender, even though the customer has not defaulted with the first lender.

This is a phenomenon that dates from the mid-1990s. Credit card companies included universal default language in their cardholder agreements at that time, due to increasing deregulation of the industry. Today, approximately half of the banks that issue credit cards have universal default language. However, since the inception of these provisions, most credit card companies have not enforced them regularly or systematically.

Every year since at least 2003, Congress has considered several bills to curb abusive credit card practices, including universal default provisions. In the meantime, the Office of the Comptroller of the Currency issued a stern advisory letter to the credit card industry regarding several of the most egregious practices. Most credit card companies have not responded to the letter.

In 2007, Citibank became the first bank to voluntarily eliminate its universal default provision.

In 2009, most forms of the practice were outlawed in the United States.

Background
Under the theory and practice of risk-based pricing, the interest rate of the loan should reflect the risk of the borrower to avoid subsidizing those who default at the expense of those who always pay on time (or alternatively, to allow loans to be given to a broader range of customers, with a broad range of credit history). 

Usually, if an interest rate is to be risk-based, the risk premium (or amount charged extra for the risk) is set at the time of an account opening. However, this does not take into consideration that the risk of a borrower defaulting may change later (and in fact the risk might be less). 

Thus, while lenders have increased credit limits and lowered rates to borrowers in good standing, reflecting the decreased perception of risk, recently lenders have begun to raise rates to those it later has found have defaulted with other lenders.

This practice generally only happens on credit cards, which are one of the only forms of consumer credit to have an adjustable interest rate not simply based on an interest rate index but on the perceived risk of the customer (both positive and negative). 

Instead of a specific increase in the risk premium charge, credit cards often change their interest rate to what is known as the default rate. This rate is usually the highest rate charged by the card, an average of 27.8%. In addition this is charged in a first in, last out FILO basis. 

Normally the default rate is charged when a customer fails to make a payment on a particular lender's credit card, but with universal default, the lender will charge the rate if the customer defaults elsewhere.

Criticisms
The concept of universal default is criticized for many reasons. 

Those who disagree with the entire concept of risk-based pricing disagree necessarily with an application of that concept.
The concept of one lender charging a higher price when their customer defaults with another lender has been compared to having a cartel, or price fixing structure.
It is thought that when a customer in dire financial straits defaults with one lender, the concept of universal default, and the subsequent interest rate increases, can create a vicious cycle which can cause the customer to default everywhere.
There is the possibility that the credit product which was shown as being in default in the first place was in default due to fraud or institutional error. If this is the case, while the customer has full legal rights to have the error corrected on his credit report, any lender who instituted the universal default rate is under no obligation to return to the normal rate.
The increased rate is seen by some to be too high even reflecting the risk.
Nature of the rate structure means that the customer usually must fully pay off their credit card before receiving the normal rate again.

Support
Supporters of the concept argue that lenders should use all available information at all times in order to avoid adverse selection. These supporters argue that the continuing practice of charging higher prices reflective of risk will allow lenders to charge lower prices reflective of non-risk, or, to extend credit to those previously thought to be too risky in the past, giving benefits to those potential borrowers. These supporters argue that the increased rates reflect the risk and are not price gouging, as proven by the steady or diminishing profit margins of the credit card business. 

Still others, while admitting that the increased default rate more than compensates for the risk, argue that competitive pressure makes that so (i.e. because lenders who do charge the default rate can possibly offer lower normal rates, while lenders who do not would seemingly have to try and advertise that the lack of a default rate is a competitive advantage (opening them up to adverse selection), or adopt the practice themselves).

Ban on forms of universal default

The Credit Card Accountability, Responsibility, and Disclosure Act of 2009 prohibited the practice of retroactively raising any annual percentage rate, fees, or finance charges for reasons unrelated to the cardholder's behavior with their account. One of the intentions of this law was to shield customers from arbitrary rate increases if they have been on time with their account. 

However, this law did not prohibit all forms of universal default. Credit card companies have begun the practice of canceling altogether the accounts of customers who are delinquent or in default with other credit agencies even if the customer is still in good standing with the credit card company.

References

External links
Frontline: Secret History of the Credit Card

Financial services in the United States
Ethically disputed business practices
Credit card terminology